Brian Keith Mitchell (born August 18, 1968) is a former American football running back and return specialist in the National Football League (NFL). He was originally drafted by the Washington Redskins in the fifth round (130th overall) of the 1990 NFL Draft. He played college football at Louisiana (then known as University of Southwestern Louisiana) where he was a quarterback. Mitchell is considered one of the greatest return specialists in NFL history.

Mitchell also played for the Philadelphia Eagles and the New York Giants. He is currently second on the NFL's all-time list in all-purpose yardage  with 23,330 yards, behind Jerry Rice. He is also first all-time for combined yardage for a non-wide receiver. His 13 special teams touchdowns are second in NFL history, behind Devin Hester, and his nine punt return touchdowns are third behind Eric Metcalf with 10, and Hester with 14. Mitchell was ranked the second greatest specialist in NFL history by NFL Network's NFL Top 10 Return Aces.

As of February 2021, Mitchell began co-hosting the radio show "BMitch and Finlay" on WJFK-FM with JP Finlay of NBC Sports Washington.

College career
Mitchell attended the University of Southwestern Louisiana (now the University of Louisiana at Lafayette), where he played quarterback.

At Southwestern Louisiana, Mitchell became the first player in NCAA history to pass for more than 5,000 yards (5,447) and rush for more than 3,000 yards (3,335). He also held the NCAA record for most rushing touchdowns by a quarterback (47). As a senior, he rushed for 1,311 yards and passed for 1,966 yards while accounting for 25 touchdowns (six passing, 19 rushing). Yet, in his college career, he never returned a punt or a kickoff.

Professional career

Mitchell was selected in the fifth round (130th overall) of the 1990 NFL Draft by the Washington Redskins.

Washington Redskins
As a rookie, Mitchell started off his career by returning the opening kickoff of the Redskins first pre-season game for a touchdown. During a Monday Night Football game that came to be known as "The Body Bag Game" on November 12, 1990, Mitchell had to be subbed in as quarterback after the Philadelphia Eagles knocked the Redskins' starting and backup quarterbacks out of the game. Mitchell went 3-for-6 for 40 yards passing and ran for a touchdown.

During his second season with the Redskins in 1991, Mitchell led the NFL in punt return yards (600) and punt return touchdowns (two), helping his team to an appearance in Super Bowl XXVI, where Washington defeated the Buffalo Bills 37–24.

Mitchell continued to play for the Redskins until 1999, leading the NFL in punt return average (14.1) and touchdowns (two) in 1994, and making a Pro Bowl selection in 1995. He also led the league in combined yards every season from 1994 through 1996, and again in 1998. He is one of only two players to lead the league in that statistical category at least four times. The other is Hall of Famer Jim Brown, who did it five times.

Mitchell was released following the 1999 season with the arrival of a new owner, Daniel Snyder.

Later career
Mitchell signed with the Philadelphia Eagles in 2000, and played for them until 2002. Despite only playing with the team for 3 years, Mitchell left as the franchise's all-time leader in punt return yards, and retains this record to this day.

In 2002, Mitchell was one of only two players to be ranked in the top seven in both kickoff returns and punt returns (the other being Michael Lewis of the New Orleans Saints). He was the only player in the NFC to be ranked in the top three in both categories. Mitchell was second in the NFC and third in the NFL with a career-high 27.0-yard average on 43 kickoff returns. Mitchell was also third in the NFC and seventh in the NFL with a 12.3-yard punt return average on 46 punts. He returned a punt 76 yards for a touchdown against the San Francisco 49ers on November 25. It was Mitchell's 13th career kick returned for a touchdown, breaking a tie with Eric Metcalf and ranking Mitchell first in the record book. That week, he also set a record for kick return yards in a single game with 206 yards on six kick returns.

He then signed with the New York Giants for the 2003 season. However, after the season, he was released before the 2004 season. He then re-signed to a one-day contract with the Washington Redskins, allowing him to retire a Redskin.

Legacy

Mitchell is the NFL's second all-time leader in total yardage, second only to Jerry Rice with 23,330 yards, thanks in large part to his 14,014 yards from kickoff returns and his 4,999 punt return yards. Both are NFL records, and his 875 postseason kickoff return yards are a record as well. He also rushed for 1,967 yards on 388 carries (avg. 5.1 rushing yards), caught 255 passes for 2,336 yards, recovered 20 fumbles for 14 return yards, and scored 29 touchdowns (four kickoff returns, nine punt returns, 12 rushing, and four receiving). His 13 special teams touchdowns rank second in the NFL only behind Devin Hester. His nine punt return touchdowns rank third behind Hester (11) and Eric Metcalf (10).

Brian Mitchell also holds the NFL record for most combined yards by any one player against a single opponent: 3,076 all-purpose yards against the Dallas Cowboys.

He is also one of only five players to record four seasons of over 2,000 total yards, (the others being Marshall Faulk, Dante Hall, Darren Sproles, and Tiki Barber) and missed out on a fifth by only five yards.

He was inducted into the Washington Redskins Ring of Fame at FedEx Field during the 2009 season.

On September 14, 2016, Brian Mitchell was nominated for the 2017 class of the Pro Football Hall of Fame, but he was not selected as a finalist.  On September 22, 2021, he was nominated for the 2022 class.

NFL records

 Combined kickoff and punt return yards: 19,013
 Combined kickoff and punt returns: 1,070
 Kickoff return yards: 14,014
 Kickoff returns: 607
 Punt return yards: 4,999
 Punt returns: 463
 Fair catches: 231
 All-purpose yards by any player against a single opponent: 3,076 against the Dallas Cowboys
 Kickoff return yards in postseason: 875
 Kickoff returns in postseason: 36
 Punt return yards in postseason: 339
 Punt returns in postseason: 34-tied with David Meggett
 Combined return yards in postseason: 1,214
 Combined returns in postseason: 70
 Games with 100 all purpose yards: 118
 Games with 200 all purpose yards: 15
 All-purpose yards on Sunday games only: 20,818
 All-purpose yards in a single decade (1990–1999): 16,905
 Combined return yards on Sunday games only: 16,957
 Most rushing yards in a game by a player with 3 attempts or less: 105, on 2 attempts; October 1, 2000

Life after football

On television
Since retiring, Mitchell has been a TV and radio host and analyst for a variety of outlets. On TV, he is currently the NFL analyst for WUSA-TV in Washington D.C., where he co-hosts the station's Sunday night wrap-up program entitled "Sports Plus. Additionally, Mitchell co-hosts "Sports Talk Live" with ex-hog Ric "Doc" Walker and can be seen on Redskins Pre/Post Game Live," both on NBC Sports Washington in Washington, D.C.

On radio
On radio, Mitchell was the host of The Brian Mitchell Show on WTEM, located in Rockville, Maryland, until the show ended on April 27, 2007 because of program lineup changes. He then moved to The John Thompson Show as co-host. During the 2008 season on an edition of "The John Thompson Show," Mitchell got into a heated argument with Redskins running back Clinton Portis, who was a guest on the show.  Mitchell served as a frequent guest and guest host on "The Sports Junkies" and the "Mike Wise Show" on 106.7 The Fan. Brian announced on the January 21, 2010 edition of the Mike Wise Show that he would have his own show on Saturdays from 10–3 on 106.7 The Fan.  He also runs the Brian Mitchell Football Camp throughout Virginia.  Since March 2012, Mitchell has co-hosted ESPN 980's Inside The Locker Room with former Redskin Rick Walker and local DC area broadcaster Scott Jackson. In 2018, The Brian Mitchell Show returned with Mitchell hosting alongside Scott Linn.

In February 2021, 106.7 the Fan in Washington announced their new radio show, BMitch and Finlay'', that is co-hosted by Mitchell and NBC Sports Washington's Washington Football Team beat reporter JP Finlay. The show replaced Chad Dukes Vs. the World after the radio station fired the show's host, Chad Dukes.

Personal life
Mitchell has four children with his wife Monica. He founded the Brian Mitchell Foundation in 2001 to help disadvantaged children in Philadelphia, Washington, D.C. and his hometown of Plaquemine, Louisiana.

References

External links
 Brian Mitchell Foundation
 

1968 births
Living people
American football quarterbacks
American football return specialists
American football running backs
Louisiana Ragin' Cajuns football players
New York Giants players
Philadelphia Eagles players
Washington Redskins players
National Conference Pro Bowl players
People from Plaquemine, Louisiana
People from Vernon Parish, Louisiana
Players of American football from Louisiana
African-American players of American football
21st-century African-American people
20th-century African-American sportspeople